The 1928 Dayton Triangles season was their ninth in the league. The team failed to improve on their previous output of 1–6–1, losing seven games. They finished tenth in the league.

Schedule

Standings

References

Dayton Triangles seasons
Dayton Triangles
Dayton Tri
National Football League winless seasons